Ashfield railway station is a railway station serving the Milton and Parkhouse areas of Glasgow, Scotland. It has two side platforms. Services are provided by ScotRail on behalf of Strathclyde Partnership for Transport (SPT).

History 

Opened in 1993 under British Rail management during the Sectorisation era introduced in the 1980s, the station was served by ScotRail until the privatisation of British Rail came into effect on 1 April 1994.  It was one of five new stations to be opened as part of the Maryhill Line project, with three of them (including this one) on new sites.  The line through the station is however a lot older, being opened back in 1858 by the Glasgow, Dumbarton and Helensburgh Railway and has been used since the latter end of the 19th century by West Highland Line passenger and freight trains to reach the Edinburgh and Glasgow Railway main line at Cowlairs and hence Queen Street High Level.

Services 

Since 18 May 2014, a limited hourly Sunday service now operates on this line – trains call between 09:30 and 19:00.

Notes

References

External links

Railway stations in Glasgow
SPT railway stations
Railway stations served by ScotRail
Railway stations in Great Britain opened in 1993
Railway stations opened by British Rail